Hooten is a surname derived from when the family resided in the settlement of Hooton, Cheshire. Notable people with the surname include:

 David B. Hooten (born 1962), Italian musician
 Jason Hooten (born 1969), American basketball coach
 Katie Hooten, American producer and actress
 Leon Hooten (born 1948), American baseball player
 Peter Hooten (born 1950), American actor

See also
 Hooten & the Lady, British television series
 E.E. Hooten House, historic house
 The Hooten Hallers, blues-rock band

Surnames of Old English origin